Annika Viilo (born 12 November 1965) is a Finnish orienteering competitor and world champion. She won a gold medal at the 1995 World Orienteering Championships in Detmold with the Finnish relay team. She received a silver medal on the Classic distance at the 1993 World Championships in West Point, and also a silver medal with the relay team, and she received a bronze medal with the relay team in 1989 (Skaraborg).

After retiring, Viilo has been working as a middle school teacher, teaching health education and P.E.

In 2016 she won a gold medal at the World Masters Orienteering Championships in Estonia on long distance in W50 category.

See also
 Finnish orienteers
 List of orienteers
 List of orienteering events

References

External links
 
 

1965 births
Living people
Finnish orienteers
Female orienteers
Foot orienteers
World Orienteering Championships medalists